Crewe was a constituency of the House of Commons of the Parliament of the United Kingdom from 1885 to 1983. It elected one Member of Parliament (MP) by the first past the post system of election.

History
Crewe was first created as one of eight single-member divisions of Cheshire under the Redistribution of Seats Act 1885. As its name suggested, the constituency was centred on the town of Crewe in Cheshire. The town of Nantwich was also included in the constituency until 1955, when it gained its own eponymous seat.

It was abolished following the reorganisation of local authorities in 1974 by the Third Periodic Review of Westminster constituencies for the 1983 general election, when it was divided roughly equally between the new constituencies of Crewe and Nantwich, and Congleton.

Boundaries
1885–1918: The Municipal Borough of Crewe, and parts of the Sessional Divisions of Nantwich and Northwich.

Included the parishes of Alsager, Haslington, Nantwich and Sandbach.

1918–1950: The Municipal Borough of Crewe, the Urban Districts of Alsager and Nantwich, and parts of the Rural Districts of Congleton and Nantwich.

Sandbach transferred to Northwich.

1950–1955: The Municipal Borough of Crewe, the Urban District of Nantwich, and the Rural District of Nantwich.

Gained the remainder of the Rural District of Nantwich, including Audlem, from the abolished constituency of Eddisbury. Sandbach and the part of the Rural District of Congleton transferred to Knutsford.

1955–1983: The Municipal Borough of Crewe, the Urban Districts of Alsager and Sandbach, and in the Rural District of Nantwich the civil parishes of Barthomley, Crewe, Haslington, and Weston.

Gained Alsager and Sandbach back from Knutsford. The Urban District and the bulk of the Rural District of Nantwich transferred to the new constituency of Nantwich.

From 1 April 1974 until the constituency was abolished at the next boundary review which came into effect for the 1983 general election, the constituency comprised parts of the newly formed Boroughs of Congleton, and Crewe and Nantwich, but its boundaries were unchanged.

On abolition, the part comprising the former Municipal Borough of Crewe was included in the new constituency of Crewe and Nantwich, with Alsager, Haslington and Sandbach was added to the new constituency of Congleton.

Members of Parliament

Elections

Elections in the 1880s

Elections in the 1890s

Elections in the 1900s

Elections in the 1910s 

General Election 1914–15:

Another General Election was required to take place before the end of 1915. The political parties had been making preparations for an election to take place and by the July 1914, the following candidates had been selected; 
Unionist: Ernest Craig
Liberal: Joseph Davies

Elections in the 1920s 

Liberal candidate, Alexander Lyle-Samuel withdrew.

Elections in the 1930s 

General Election 1939–40

Another General Election was required to take place before the end of 1940. The political parties had been making preparations for an election to take place and by the Autumn of 1939, the following candidates had been selected; 
Conservative: Donald Somervell
Labour: William Bowen

Elections in the 1940s

Elections in the 1950s

Elections in the 1960s

Elections in the 1970s

See also 

 History of parliamentary constituencies and boundaries in Cheshire

References

Crewe
Parliamentary constituencies in Cheshire (historic)
Constituencies of the Parliament of the United Kingdom established in 1885
Constituencies of the Parliament of the United Kingdom disestablished in 1983